Oscar Van Den Bossche (21 July 1888 – 27 April 1951) was a Belgian rower. He competed at the 1920 Summer Olympics in Antwerp with the men's coxed pair where he together with his brother Georges was eliminated in round one.

References

1888 births
1951 deaths
Belgian male rowers
Olympic rowers of Belgium
Rowers at the 1920 Summer Olympics
Rowers from Ghent
European Rowing Championships medalists
20th-century Belgian people